Apostibes dhahrani is a moth of the family Scythrididae. It was described by Pietro Passerin d'Entrèves and Angela Roggero in 2003. It is found in eastern Saudi Arabia.

Etymology
The species name is derived from Dhahran, the type locality.

References

Scythrididae
Moths described in 2003
Moths of the Arabian Peninsula
Endemic fauna of Saudi Arabia